Valeria Kurbatova; born 1992) is a harpist, who lives and performs in London. Kurbatova is a member of the Globe Ensemble, a harp, flute and viola trio, and is also a session musician in pop and dance music.

Education 
Kurbatova's musical study began at the age of 8, when she was awarded a scholarship to study at the Gnessin State Musical College in Moscow.

Kurbatova is a graduate of the Royal College of Music in London where she studied under Professor Ieuan Jones and received a scholarship from ABRSM.

Career 
Kurbatova is a founding member and principal harpist of the London Electronic Orchestra, started by Chicago house music producer and DJ Kate Simko. London Electronic Orchestra opened the iTunes Festival at the Roundhouse in London in 2013 and has recently released their debut album on The Vinyl Factory with contributions from house music impresario Jamie Jones. Kurbatova and Simko also featured alongside a host of pop artists on with Katy B’s 2016 album Honey. In February 2016, Kurbatova became a resident at entrepreneur Alan Yau's flagship centre for music in London, Park Chinois.

References

External links 
 
 
 
 

Russian harpists
Musicians from Moscow
Living people
1992 births